is a glass artist from Japan. Her work is in the permanent collection of Corning Museum of Glass.

Biography 
Sasaki completed a Bachelor of Arts degree in industrial, interior and craft design at Musashino Art University in Tokyo. She moved to the United States in 2007, and studied at Rhode Island School of Design, where she received a Master of Fine Arts in glass in 2010.

In 2019 she received the Rakow Commission from Corning Museum of Glass.

References

Rhode Island School of Design alumni
1984 births
Living people
Glass artists
21st-century Japanese artists
Women glass artists
Artists from Saitama Prefecture